Eudema nubigena is a species of flowering plant in the family Brassicaceae. It is found only in Ecuador. Its natural habitat is rocky areas. It is threatened by habitat loss.

References

nubigena
Flora of Ecuador
Endangered plants
Taxa named by Aimé Bonpland
Taxonomy articles created by Polbot